Narit Taweekul (born October 30, 1983) is a Thai professional footballer who plays as a goalkeeper.

International career

He started playing for the national side in 2004. In 2013 Narit was called up to the national team by Surachai Jaturapattarapong to the 2015 AFC Asian Cup qualification, after not playing for the national team for a while.

International

Honours

Club
Tobacco Monopoly
 Thai Premier League: 2004-05
Bangkok Glass
 Thai FA Cup: 2014

International
Thailand U-23
 Sea Games Gold Medal; 2005

Individual
 Thai Premier League Player of the Month: July 2013
 Thai Premier League Goalkeeper of the Year: 2013

References

External links
 Profile at Goal
https://us.soccerway.com/players/narit-taweekul/10793/

1983 births
Living people
Narit Taweekul
Narit Taweekul
Association football goalkeepers
Narit Taweekul
Narit Taweekul
Narit Taweekul
Narit Taweekul
Narit Taweekul
Narit Taweekul
Narit Taweekul
Footballers at the 2006 Asian Games
2007 AFC Asian Cup players
Narit Taweekul
Southeast Asian Games medalists in football
Competitors at the 2005 Southeast Asian Games
Narit Taweekul